Ernst Huber (born 1902) was an Austrian fencer who competed in the individual and team foil competitions at the 1924 Summer Olympics.

References

External links
 

1902 births
Year of death missing
Austrian male foil fencers
Olympic fencers of Austria
Fencers at the 1924 Summer Olympics